Minsok village (Korean Folk Village) is a living museum type of tourist attraction in the city of Yongin, a satellite city in the Seoul Metropolitan Area in the province of Gyeonggi in South Korea. It was first opened on October 3, 1974 (ground breaking in 1973 and completion in 1974). Korean Folk Village is a popular tourist destination for both Koreans and foreigners, located near South Korea's largest amusement park, Everland.

Real houses from across the country were relocated and restored to create a replica of a village from the late Joseon period. Events such as celebrating seasonal changes and traditional performances are held in KFV. The village is set up in a natural environment occupying approximately 245 acres. Over 260 traditional houses reminiscent of the late Joseon Dynasty can be found there. The purpose of the Korean Folk Village is to display elements of traditional Korean life and culture. There are multiple sections to the park, including numerous replicas of traditional houses of the different social classes (peasant, landowner, yangban) from various regions.

History 
The Korean Folk Village was the first open-air museum constructed in South Korea. Construction of the Korean Folk Village began as a way to preserve traditional Korean culture and customs, including traditional Korean architecture, food, and clothing in response to the rapid westernisation and industrialisation of Korea during the 1960s. The village's buildings have either been restored or relocated from other provinces around Korea.

Living culture experience
Inside the folk village, staff members dress up in distinctive costumes depicting several characters from the Joseon Dynasty such as Sato (the governors), Daejanggeum (a royal of the palace), Kumiho (legendary fox with nine tails), Geosang (business magnate), etc.

There are typically four cultural performances available to watch: Nong-ak play, tightrope play, horseback martial art play, and a traditional wedding. These performances are played at each stage twice a day. Moreover, the folk village offers other cultural experiences including:
Ferry 
Horseback riding 
Natural dyeing experience
Traditional life experience
Family park performance
Main performance
The village consists of Joseon period houses and workshops, where visitors can enjoy the architectural characteristics of the Joseon dynasty and experience traditional crafts.

Traditional wedding ceremonies are also held here.

Location, access and facilities 
The village is accessible by subway and bus:

Gangnam Station: 5001-1 (10th gate, red bus, fare: 2100 won), 1560.
Suwon Station: v10-5, v37, Korean Folk village shuttle bus (using a travel bureau at Suwon station).
Sanggal Station: 30, 54, 10-5, 37 (Get off for Nagok Village). 
Miguem Station: 30, (shuttle bus)

There is a free shuttle bus that runs between Korean Folk Village and Suwon station. Round trip takes about 30 minutes.

There is a ticket fee needed for admission into the Korean Folk Village.

Facilities 
The facilities in the park cater towards the visitor's needs; entertainment, service and food. They consist of a traditional street market, restaurants, and showcases of traditional woodworking and metalworking techniques. Also, traditional dances, equestrian skills, and marriage ceremonies are performed at different locations around the park. Several arts and crafts shops with food produced by local artisans, recreational activities, and an ample selection of places to eat can be found as well.

The amusement park section has rides and games, an art museum, a sculpture garden, a Korean Folk Museum, and a World Folk Museum which highlights traditional lifestyles from around the world.

The village was used as a filming location for Munhwa Broadcasting Corporation (MBC) 2012 drama Moon Embracing the Sun as local markets, private residences of commoners, and night scenes.

There are various exhibition halls that provide a broadened view of the folk culture:

 Nine world folk exhibition hall (860 cultural artefacts).
 One earth ware exhibition hall (3,000 or so cultural artefacts).
 One masked dance exhibition hall (30 cultural artefacts).

Food and Shopping 
Snack bars can be found in the food market, also known as Jumak, where visitors can enjoy various types of Korean food. These include sweet ice-cream, Winibini candy (also known as Weeny Beeny), Railroad hotdog and Imsil cheese pizza.

There are also a variety of traditional tea houses and play village restaurants which visitors can experience. Such as the Herbal medicine shop, Traditional tea house, Railroad and Minsok Banjeom, Eight folk village shops and Souvenir and ateliers.

Attraction 
Several attraction sites of the village include bumper cars, Music express, Biking, Family Costa, Boat ride, Bounce spin, and Sled slope in winter.

Festival

Welcome to Joseon 
The cultural theme park of Korean Folk Village hosts the “Welcome to Joseon” Variety Festival each spring. An exotic program that is presented by distinctive Joseon-period characters who appear in ancient fairy tales and stories. During the festival, visitors are encouraged to directly engage with the cultural performances, allowing them to travel back in time and experience a daily life in the Joseon period.

Gallery

See also 
 List of music museums

References

External links

Korean Folk Village (Official web site)
(Korean Folk Village Blog-Korean)
(Twitter)
(Facebook)

Yongin
Museums in Gyeonggi Province
Tourist attractions in Gyeonggi Province
Folk villages in South Korea
Folk museums in South Korea
Open-air museums in South Korea
Agriculture museums in South Korea
Korean traditions